Unite is the nineteenth studio album by the band Kool & the Gang, released in 1992 following a three-year gap between albums. It marked the return of Khalis Bayyan to the group after his absence on Sweat.  The album was released on iTunes under the title "Jump Up On It!".

Release and reception

Kool & the Gang's first album in three years, Unite was originally released by the Los Angeles-based JRS Records before being re-released on April 27, 1993 by Mogull Entertainment, with the title track issued as the lead single on April 9. To coincide with the 1993 release, band member Robert "Kool" Bell presented some of the group's 1970s memorabilia at New York's Hard Rock Cafe. As with the group's previous album Sweat (1989), Unite was a commercial failure. 

Vlado Forgac of The Morning Star commented that the absence of former Kool & the Gang singer James "J.T." Taylor radically altered the group's sound, and criticised the material for being "too much like older guys trying to be hip and young and sounding to obvious to be taken seriously." However, he added that listeners who were unfamiliar with the group's earlier material might enjoy the album's "'90s-ish R&B". North County Blade-Citizen reviewer Dan Bennett wrote that Unite is "where groove meets high-tech", further describing the songs as "cutting edge soul/jazz bites laced with the hip-hop urgency of that new street sound" and comparing them to James Brown's contemporary Universal James (1993). He found that despite the album sometimes "[straining] to find its own identity", he praised the group for possessing the "raw energy and musical know how" to survive. Corpus Christi Caller-Times reviewed the single "Unite" as an "uplifting call for peace" and praised singer Odeen Mays for "being inspirational without showboating".

Track listing

References

Kool & the Gang albums
1992 albums
1993 albums
New jack swing albums
Contemporary R&B albums by American artists